Riverhurst is a village in the Canadian province of Saskatchewan within the Rural Municipality of Maple Bush No. 224 and Census Division No. 7. It is in the southwest Coteau Hills area of the province, north of the Vermillion Hills. The community is located on Highway 42 east of Riverhurst Ferry. The village is primarily a farming community.

The name is a portmanteau of Riverside and Boldenhurst, two nearby post offices.

History 
Riverhurst incorporated as a village on June 22, 1916.

Demographics 

Infrastructure

Riverhurst is situated close to the east bank of Lake Diefenbaker, and is the location of the Riverhurst Ferry, a cable ferry that crosses  to Lucky Lake on the west bank. Highway 42 (which provides access to the community) crosses Lake Diefenbaker by the Riverhurst Ferry. The village is located 8 km south of the Elbow crater.

Notable residents

Royal Canadian Mounted Police Constable Thomas Brian King (who was shot to death in Saskatoon) lived in Riverhurst.

See also

 List of villages in Saskatchewan
 List of communities in Saskatchewan
 List of geographic names derived from portmanteaus

References

External links

Villages in Saskatchewan
Maple Bush No. 224, Saskatchewan
Division No. 7, Saskatchewan